Nurduz (also Romanized as Nūrdūz) is a village in Nowjeh Mehr Rural District, Siah Rud District, Jolfa County, East Azerbaijan Province, Iran. At the 2006 census, its population was 14, in 4 families. It is situated near Iran's sole border crossing with Armenia. The Armenian town of Agarak is located right across the Aras.

References 

Populated places in Jolfa County